Nirmal Kumar ( born December 14, 1928, in Kolkata, India) is an Indian Bengali and Hindi film actor. Nirmal Kumar is married to Bengali film actress Madhabi Mukherjee and has two daughters. He won the B.F.J.A award for his role in Kamal Lata. Nirmal Kumar acted in many commercially successful movies.

Filmography

 Dhamak
 Jekhane Ashroy
 Ek Nadir Galpo
 Annaya Attayachar
 Iti Srikanta
 Rakta Bandhan
 Barkane
 Protibad
 Kalankini Badhu
 Shasti Holo
 Dabidar
 Nirjan Dwip
 Sriman Bhootnath
 Jiban Sandhan
 Biyer Phul
 Lathi
 Sinthir Sindoor
 Tarini Tarama
 Protidhwani
 Rangin Basanta
 Kaal Purush
 Raktanadir Dhara
 Mayer Ashirbad
 Prithibir Shesh Station
 Mani Kanchan
 Sadharan Meye
 Bourani
 Apon Amar Apon
 Byabadhan
 Aakrosh
 Asha-o-Bhalobasha
 Mandanda
 Mone Mone
 Aparanher Alo
 Surer Sathi
 Tumi Koto Sundar
 Amar bandhan
 Jiban Sathi
 Lakhon Ki Baat
 Adalat O Ekti Meye
 Agni sambhaba
 Lal Pathar
 Madhya Rater Tara
 Khaniker Atithi
 Sudarshan Chakra
 Du-janay
 Upahar
 Bhangagara
 Kalindi
 Godhuli
 Baazi
 Meerabai

References

External links
 
 Nirmal Kumar in Gomolo

Living people
1928 births
Bengali male actors
Indian male film actors
Bengali Hindus
Indian Hindus
Male actors in Hindi cinema
Male actors in Bengali cinema
Male actors from Kolkata
20th-century Indian male actors